Eliseev is a Russian surname. Notable people with the surname include:

Grigory Eliseev (1821–1891), Russian journalist, editor, and publisher
Matvey Eliseev (born 1993), Russian biathlete
Vitali Eliseev (born 1950), Russian rower

See also
Yeliseyev
Eliseyev Emporium (Saint Petersburg)

Russian-language surnames